Riku Helenius (born March 1, 1988) is a Finnish professional ice hockey goaltender currently playing for Dresdner Eislöwen in the DEL2.

Playing career
Helenius was selected 15th overall in the 2006 NHL Entry Draft by the Tampa Bay Lightning, partly on the strength of his silver medal-winning performance for the Finnish national men's hockey team in the 2006 under-18 World Junior Championships. He played for Ilves during the 2006–07 season but due to a shoulder injury only played four games.

The Seattle Thunderbirds selected Helenius with the 46th overall selection in the 2007 Canadian Hockey League Import Draft. Helenius joined the Thunderbirds roster at the start of the 2007–2008 season. In December 2007, Helenius was selected as goalie for the Finnish World Junior Team in the 2008 IIHF World Junior Championships.

On October 17, 2008, Helenius was assigned to the Augusta Lynx of the ECHL. He played first NHL game on January 30, 2009, against the Philadelphia Flyers.

In 2009, he went on to play for Södertälje SK after playing just 10 game for the Norfolk Admirals.

For the 2011–12 season he returned to Finland and signed with JYP Jyväskylä of the SM-liiga, where he won the league championship and the Urpo Ylönen trophy for best goaltender.

After a great season in Finland, Steve Yzerman, General Manager of the Tampa Bay Lightning, expressed interest in bringing Helenius back to North America, as he was still a Lightning prospect. On June 13, 2012, Helenius signed a two-year contract with the Lightning.

In the midst of the 2013–14 season, with Helenius unable to make an impact up the Lightning's depth chart, on February 22, 2014, he was placed on $125 unconditional waivers, which would bring his contract with the Tampa Bay Lightning to an mutual end.

On April 14, 2014, Helenius agreed to a multi-year contract with Finnish club Jokerit of the KHL.

Career statistics

Regular season and playoffs

International

References

External links

1988 births
Living people
Augusta Lynx players
Dresdner Eislöwen players
Elmira Jackals (ECHL) players
Florida Everblades players
Ilves players
Jokerit players
JYP Jyväskylä players
KalPa players
Lahti Pelicans players
Mississippi Sea Wolves players
National Hockey League first-round draft picks
Norfolk Admirals players
People from Pälkäne
Seattle Thunderbirds players
Södertälje SK players
Syracuse Crunch players
Tampa Bay Lightning draft picks
Tampa Bay Lightning players
Finnish ice hockey goaltenders
Sportspeople from Pirkanmaa